The first AFL–NFL World Championship Game (known retroactively as Super BowlI and referred to in contemporaneous reports, including the game's radio broadcast, as the Super Bowl) was an American football game played on January 15, 1967, at the Los Angeles Memorial Coliseum in Los Angeles, California. The National Football League (NFL) champion Green Bay Packers defeated the American Football League (AFL) champion Kansas City Chiefs by the score of 35–10.

Coming into the game, considerable animosity existed between the AFL and NFL, thus the teams representing the two rival leagues (Kansas City and Green Bay, respectively) felt additional pressure to win. The Chiefs posted an 11–2–1 record during the regular season, and defeated the Buffalo Bills 31–7 in the AFL Championship Game. The Packers finished the regular season at 12–2 and defeated the Dallas Cowboys 34–27 in the NFL Championship Game. Many sportswriters and fans believed any team in the older NFL was vastly superior to any club in the upstart AFL, and so expected Green Bay would blow out Kansas City.

The first half of Super Bowl I was competitive, as the Chiefs outgained the Packers in total yards,  and kept pace with Green Bay by posting a  score at halftime. Early in the third quarter, Green Bay safety Willie Wood intercepted a pass and returned it 50 yards to the 5-yard line. The turnover sparked the Packers to score 21 unanswered points in the second half. Green Bay quarterback Bart Starr, who completed 16 of 23 passes for 250 yards and two touchdowns, with one interception, was named MVP.

The game remains the only Super Bowl to have been simulcast in the United States by two networks. NBC had the rights to nationally televise AFL games, while CBS held the rights to broadcast NFL games; both were allowed to televise the game.

Background

Origins

The NFL had successfully fended off several other rival leagues in the past, and so the older league initially ignored the new upstart and its eight teams, figuring it would be made up of nothing but NFL rejects, and that fans were unlikely to prefer it to the NFL. But unlike the NFL's prior rivals, the AFL survived and prospered, in part by signing "NFL rejects" who turned out to be highly talented players the older league had badly misjudged. Soon the NFL and AFL found themselves locked in a massive bidding war for the top free agents and prospects coming out of college. Originally, there was a tacit agreement between the two not to raid each other by signing players who were already under contract with a team from an opposing league. This policy broke down in early 1966 when the NFL's New York Giants signed Pete Gogolak, a placekicker who was under contract with the AFL's Buffalo Bills. The AFL owners considered this an "act of war" and immediately struck back, signing several contracted NFL players, including eight of their top quarterbacks.

Eventually, the NFL had enough and started negotiations with the AFL in an attempt to resolve the issue. As a result of the negotiations, the leagues signed a merger agreement on June 9, 1966. Among the details, both leagues agreed to share a common draft to end the bidding war for the top college players, as well as merge into a single league after the  season. In addition, an "AFL–NFL World Championship Game" was established, in which the AFL and NFL champions would play against each other in a game at the end of the season to determine which league had the best team.

Los Angeles wasn't awarded the game until December 1, less than seven weeks prior to the kickoff; likewise, the date of the game was not set until December 13. Since the AFL Championship Game originally was scheduled for Monday, December 26, and the NFL Championship Game for Sunday, January1, the "new" championship game was suggested to be played Sunday, January 8. An unprecedented TV doubleheader was held on January 1, with the AFL Championship Game telecast from Buffalo on NBC and the NFL Championship Game telecast from Dallas on CBS three hours later.

Coming into this "first" game, considerable animosity still existed between the two rival leagues, with both of them putting pressure on their respective champions to trounce the other and prove each league's dominance in professional football. Still, many sportswriters and fans believed the game was a mismatch, and any team from the long-established NFL was far superior to the best team from the upstart AFL.

The players' shares were $15,000 each for the winning team and $7,500 each for the losing team. This was in addition to the league championship money earned two weeks earlier: the Packers' shares were $8,600 each and the Chiefs' were $5,308 each.

Kansas City Chiefs

The Chiefs entered the game after an 11–2–1 regular season and a decisive 31–7 road win over the defending AFL champion Buffalo Bills in the AFL championship game on New Year's Day.

Kansas City's high-powered offense led the AFL in points scored (448) and total rushing yards (2,274). Their trio of running backs, Mike Garrett (801 yards), Bert Coan (521 yards), and Curtis McClinton (540 yards) all ranked among the top-ten rushers in the AFL. Quarterback Len Dawson was the top-rated passer in the AFL, completing 159 of 284 (56%) of his passes for 2,527 yards and 26 touchdowns. Wide receiver Otis Taylor provided the team with a great deep threat by recording 58 receptions for 1,297 yards and eight touchdowns. Receiver Chris Burford added 58 receptions for 758 yards and eight touchdowns, and tight end Fred Arbanas, who had 22 catches for 305 yards and four touchdowns, was one of six Chiefs offensive players who were named to the All-AFL team.  Kansas City's offensive line was led by tackle Jim Tyrer, had been selected to the AFL pro bowl for the 5th time in his career.

The Chiefs also had a strong defense, with All-AFL players Jerry Mays and Buck Buchanan anchoring their line. Linebacker Bobby Bell, who was also named to the All-AFL team, was great at run stopping and pass coverage. The strongest part of their defense, though, was their secondary, led by All-AFL safeties Johnny Robinson and Bobby Hunt, who each recorded 10 interceptions, and Fred Williamson, who recorded four. Their head coach was Hank Stram.

Green Bay Packers

The Packers were an NFL dynasty, turning around what had been a losing team just eight years earlier. The team had posted an NFL-worst 1–10–1 record in 1958 before head coach Vince Lombardi was hired in January 1959. "Their offense was like a conga dance", one sportswriter quipped. "1, 2, 3and kick."

Lombardi was determined to build a winning team. During the preseason, he signed Fred "Fuzzy" Thurston, who had been cut from three other teams, but ended up becoming an All-Pro left guard for Green Bay. Lombardi also made a big trade with the Cleveland Browns that brought three players to the team who would become cornerstones of the defense: linemen Henry Jordan, Willie Davis, and Bill Quinlan.

Lombardi's hard work paid off, and the Packers improved to a 7–5 regular-season record in 1959. They surprised the league during the following year by making it to the 1960 NFL Championship Game. Although the Packers lost, 17–13, to the Philadelphia Eagles, they had sent a clear message that they were no longer losers. Green Bay went on to win NFL Championships in 1961, 1962, 1965, and 1966.

Packers veteran quarterback Bart Starr was the top-rated quarterback in the NFL for 1966, and won the NFL Most Valuable Player Award, completing 156 of 251 (62.2%) passes for 2257 yards (9.0 per attempt), 14 touchdowns, and only three interceptions. His top targets were wide receivers Boyd Dowler and Carroll Dale, who combined for 63 receptions for 1,336 yards. Fullback Jim Taylor was the team's top rusher with 705 yards, adding four touchdowns, and caught 41 passes for 331 yards and two touchdowns. (Before the season, Taylor had informed the team that instead of returning to the Packers in 1967, he would become a free agent and sign with the expansion New Orleans Saints. Lombardi, infuriated at what he considered to be Taylor's disloyalty, refused to speak to Taylor the entire season.) The team's starting halfback, Paul Hornung, was injured early in the season and replaced by running back Elijah Pitts, who gained 857 all-purpose yards. The Packers' offensive line was also a big reason for the team's success, led by All-Pro guards Jerry Kramer, and Fuzzy Thurston, and tackle Forrest Gregg.

Green Bay also had an excellent defense that displayed their talent in the NFL championship game, stopping the Dallas Cowboys on four consecutive plays starting from the Packers 2-yard line on the final drive to win the game. Lionel Aldridge had replaced Quinlan, but Jordan and Davis still anchored the defensive line; linebacker Ray Nitschke excelled at run stopping and pass coverage, while the secondary was led by Herb Adderley and Willie Wood. Wood was another example of how Lombardi found talent nobody else could see. Wood had been a quarterback in college and was not drafted by an NFL team. When Wood joined the Packers in 1960, he was converted to a free safety and went on to make the All-Pro team nine times in his 12-year career.

Pregame news and notes
Many people considered it fitting that the Chiefs and the Packers would be the teams to play in the first-ever AFL–NFL World Championship Game. Chiefs owner Lamar Hunt had founded the AFL, while Green Bay was widely considered one of the best teams in NFL history (even if they could not claim to be founding members of their league, as the Packers joined the NFL in 1921, a year after the league's formation). Lombardi was under intense pressure from the entire NFL to make sure the Packers not only won the game but preferably won big to demonstrate the superiority of the NFL. CBS announcer Frank Gifford, who interviewed Lombardi before the game, said Lombardi was so nervous, "he held onto my arm and he was shaking like a leaf. It was incredible." The Chiefs saw this game as an opportunity to show they were good enough to play against any NFL team. One player who was looking forward to competing in this game was Len Dawson, who had spent three years as a backup in the NFL before joining the Chiefs. However, the Chiefs were also nervous. Linebacker E. J. Holub said, "the Chiefs were scared to death. Guys in the tunnel were throwing up."

In the week before the game, Chiefs cornerback Fred "The Hammer" Williamson garnered considerable publicity by boasting he would use his "hammer" – forearm blows to the head – to destroy the Packers' receivers, stating, "Two hammers to (Boyd) Dowler, one to (Carroll) Dale should be enough."

The Packers practiced at UC Santa Barbara, and the Chiefs at Veterans Field in Long Beach.

The two teams played with their respective footballs from each league; the Chiefs' offense used the AFL ball, the slightly narrower and longer J5V by Spalding, and the Packers played with the NFL ball, "The Duke" by Wilson.

This is also the only Super Bowl to feature the offset double-support goalposts and where the numeric yard markers were five yards apart, rather than ten as is customary today. In , marking yard lines ending in "5" were disallowed in the NFL in order to standardize field markings.
 
Justin Peters of Slate watched all the Super Bowls over a two-month period in 2015 before Super Bowl 50. He mentioned the first Super Bowl's having "two dudes in rocket packs who flew around the stadium. I can forgive a lot of bad football as long as the game features two dudes in honest-to-God rocket packs."

Tickets for this game were priced at twelve, ten, and six dollars.

Weather
The temperature was mild with clear skies.

Media coverage

Television
This game is the only Super Bowl to have been broadcast in the United States by two television networks simultaneously (no other NFL game was subsequently carried nationally on more than one network until December 29, 2007, when the New England Patriots faced the New York Giants on NBC, CBS, and the NFL Network). At the time, NBC held the rights to nationally televise AFL games while CBS had the rights to broadcast NFL games. Both networks were allowed to cover the game. During the week, tensions flared between the staff of the two networks (longtime arch-rivals in American broadcasting), who each wanted to win the rating war, to the point where a fence was built between the CBS and NBC trucks.

Each network used its own announcers: Ray Scott (doing play-by-play for the first half), Jack Whitaker (doing play-by-play for the second half) and Frank Gifford provided commentary on CBS, while Curt Gowdy and Paul Christman were on NBC. While Rozelle allowed NBC to telecast the game, he decreed it would not be able to use its cameramen and technical personnel, instead forcing it to use the feed provided by CBS, since the Coliseum was home to the NFL's Rams.

Super BowlI was the only Super Bowl that was not a sellout, despite the TV blackout in Los Angeles (at the time, the local blackout was required even at a neutral site and even if the stadium did sell out), shutting out the vast Los Angeles market and network-owned stations KNXT (Channel 2, CBS; now KCBS-TV) and KNBC (Channel 4, NBC). Of the 94,000-seat capacity in the Coliseum, 33,000 went unsold.

This is the only Super Bowl that Curt Gowdy called for NBC where the NFL or NFC team won (the AFL/AFC teams won the others, even though the Baltimore Colts and Pittsburgh Steelers were part of the old NFL before moving to the AFC following the AFL–NFL merger).

CBS received a 22.6 rating and a market share of 43 for its broadcast, which was seen by 26.75 million people. NBC received an 18.5 rating and a market share of 36 for its broadcast, which was seen by 24.43 million people. Combined, the game received a market share of 79 and reached 51.18 million viewers.

All known broadcast tapes of the game in its entirety were subsequently wiped by both NBC and CBS to save costs, a common practice in the TV industry at the time as videotapes were very expensive (one half-hour tape cost around $300 at the time, equivalent to $ in  dollars), plus it was not foreseen how big the game was going to become. This has prevented studies comparing each network's respective telecast.

For many years, only two small samples of the telecasts were known to have survived, showing Max McGee's opening touchdown and Jim Taylor's touchdown run. Both were shown in 1991 on HBO's Play by Play: A History of Sports Television and on the Super Bowl XXV pregame show.

In January 2011, a partial recording of the CBS telecast was reported to have been found in a Pennsylvania attic and restored by the Paley Center for Media in New York. The two-inch color videotape is the most complete version of the broadcast yet discovered, missing only the halftime show and most of the third quarter. The NFL owns the broadcast copyright and has blocked its sale or distribution. After remaining anonymous and communicating with the media only through his lawyer since the recording's discovery, the owner of the recording, Troy Haupt, came forward to The New York Times in 2016 to tell his side of the story.

NFL Films had a camera crew present, and retains a substantial amount of film footage in its archives, some of which have been released in its film productions. One such presentation was the NFL's Greatest Games episode about this Super Bowl, entitled The Spectacle of a Sport (also the title of the Super BowlI highlight film).

On January 11, 2016, the NFL announced that "in an exhaustive process that took months to complete, NFL Films searched its enormous archives of footage and were able to locate all 145 plays from Super BowlI from more than a couple of dozen disparate sources. Once all the plays were located, NFL Films was able to put the plays in order and stitch them together while fully restoring, re-mastering, and color-correcting the footage. Finally, audio from the NBC Sports radio broadcast featuring announcers Jim Simpson and George Ratterman was layered on top of the footage to complete the broadcast. The final result represents the only known video footage of the entire action from Super BowlI." It then announced that NFL Network would broadcast the newly pieced together footage in its entirety on January 15, 2016—the 49th anniversary of the contest. This footage was nearly all on film with the exception of several player introductions and a post-game locker room chat between Pat Summerall and Pete Rozelle.

Ceremonies and entertainment
The Los Angeles Ramettes, majorettes who had performed at all Rams home games, entertained during pregame festivities and after each quarter. Also during the pregame, the University of Arizona marching band created a physical outline of the continental United States at the center of the field, with the famed Anaheim High School drill team placing banners of each NFL and AFL team at each team's geographical location.

The postgame trophy presentation ceremony was handled by CBS' Pat Summerall and NBC's George Ratterman. Summerall and Ratterman were forced to share a single microphone.

Halftime show

The halftime show was produced by Tommy Walker, and featured trumpeter Al Hirt, the marching bands from the University of Arizona and Grambling College, the Ana-Hi-Steppers (more information below), 300 pigeons, 10,000 balloons and a flying demonstration by the hydrogen-peroxide-propelled Bell Rocket Air Men. In addition, the halftime featured a local high school drill team, the Ana-Hi-Steppers from Anaheim High School. The team joined the two university marching bands to form an outline of a United States map. Their transportation to and from the game was by school bus. This team was chosen due to their connection to Tommy Walker, whose children attended Anaheim High School. He had seen the Ana-Hi-Steppers perform and chose them over nationally famous drill teams since he only three weeks to cast and produce the show.

Game summary
Balls from both leagues were used – when the Chiefs were on offense, the official AFL football (Spalding J5V) was used, and when the Packers were on offense, the official NFL ball (Wilson's "The Duke") was used. Even the officiating crew was a combination of AFL and NFL referees, with the NFL's Norm Schachter as the head referee.

First quarter
The teams traded punts on their first possessions, then the Packers jumped to an early 7–0 lead, driving 80 yards in six plays. The drive was highlighted by Starr's passes, to Marv Fleming for 11, to Elijah Pitts for 22 yards on a scramble, and to Carroll Dale for 12 yards. On the last play, Bart Starr threw a pass to reserve receiver Max McGee, who had replaced re-injured starter Boyd Dowler earlier in the drive. (Dowler had injured his shoulder two weeks prior after scoring a third-quarter touchdown; Cowboy safety Mike Gaechter had upended him several steps after scoring and he landed awkwardly.) McGee slipped past Chiefs cornerback Willie Mitchell, made a one-handed catch at the 23-yard line, and then took off for a 37-yard touchdown reception (McGee had also caught a touchdown pass after replacing an injured Dowler in the NFL championship game). On their ensuing drive, the Chiefs moved the ball to Green Bay's 33-yard line, but kicker Mike Mercer missed a 40-yard field goal.

Second quarter
Early in the second quarter, Kansas City drove 66 yards in six plays, featuring a 31-yard reception by the receiver Otis Taylor, to tie the game on a seven-yard pass to Curtis McClinton from quarterback Len Dawson. But the Packers responded on their next drive, advancing 73 yards down the field and scoring on fullback Jim Taylor's 14-yard touchdown run with the team's famed Packers sweep play. Taylor's touchdown run was the first in Super Bowl history. This drive was again highlighted by Starr's key passes. He hit McGee for 10 yards on third and five; Dale for 15 on third and ten; Fleming for 11 on third and five; and Pitts for 10 yards on third and seven to set up Taylor's TD run on the next play.

Dawson was sacked for an eight-yard loss on the first play of the Chiefs' next drive, but he followed it up with four consecutive completions for 58 yards, including a 27-yarder to Chris Burford. This set up Mercer's 31-yard field goal to make the score 14–10 at the end of the half.

At halftime, the Chiefs appeared to have a chance to win. Many people watching the game were surprised how close the score was and how well the AFL's champions were playing. Kansas City outgained Green Bay in total yards, 181–164, and had 11 first downs compared to the Packers' nine. The Chiefs were exuberant at halftime. Hank Stram said later, "I honestly thought we would come back and win it." The Packers were disappointed with the quality of their play in the first half. "The coach was concerned", said defensive end Willie Davis later. Lombardi told them the game plan was sound, but that they had to tweak some things and execute better.

Third quarter
On their first drive of the second half, the Chiefs advanced to their 49-yard line. But on a third-down pass play, a heavy blitz by linebackers Dave Robinson and Lee Roy Caffey collapsed the Chief's pocket. Robinson, tackle Henry Jordan, and Packer right end Lionel Aldridge converged on Dawson who threw weakly toward tight end Fred Arbanas. The wobbly pass was intercepted by Willie Wood. Wood raced 50 yards to Kansas City's five-yard line where Mike Garrett dragged him down from behind. This was "the biggest play of the game," wrote Starr later. On their first play after the turnover, running back Elijah Pitts scored on a five-yard touchdown run off left tackle to give the Packers a 21–10 lead. Stram agreed that it was the critical point of the game. The Packer's defense then dominated the Chief's offense for the rest of the game, allowing them to cross midfield only once, and for just one play. The Chiefs were forced to deviate from their game plan, and that hurt them. The Kansas City offense totaled only 12 yards in the third quarter, and Dawson was held to five of 12 second-half pass completions for 59 yards.

Meanwhile, Green Bay forced Kansas City to punt from their two-yard line after sacking Dawson twice and got the ball back with good field position on their 44-yard line (despite a clipping penalty on the punt return). McGee subsequently caught three passes for 40 yards on a 56-yard drive. Taylor ran for one first down, Starr hit McGee for 16 yards on third-and-11, and a third-down sweep with Taylor carrying gained eight yards and a first down at the Kansas City 13. The drive ended with Starr's 13-yard touchdown toss to McGee on a post pattern.

Fourth quarter
Midway through the fourth quarter, Starr completed a 25-yard pass to Carroll Dale and a 37-yard strike to McGee, moving the ball to the Chiefs 18-yard line. Four plays later, Pitts scored his second touchdown on a one-yard run to close out the scoring, giving the Packers the 35–10 win. Also in the fourth quarter, Fred Williamson, who had boasted about his "hammer" before the game, was knocked out when his head collided with running back Donny Anderson's knee, and then suffered a broken arm when Chiefs linebacker Sherrill Headrick fell on him. Williamson had three tackles for the game.

Hornung was the only Packer to not see any action. Lombardi had asked him in the fourth quarter if he wanted to go in, but Hornung declined, not wanting to aggravate a pinched nerve in his neck. McGee, who caught only four passes for 91 yards and one touchdown during the season, finished Super BowlI with seven receptions for 138 yards and two touchdowns. After the game was over, a reporter asked Vince Lombardi if he thought Kansas City was a good team. Lombardi responded that though the Chiefs were an excellent, well-coached club, he thought several NFL teams such as Dallas were better.

Box score

Final statistics
Sources: NFL.com Super Bowl I, Super Bowl Play Finder GB, Super Bowl Play Finder KC

Statistical comparison

Note: According to NBC Radio announcer Jim Simpson's report at halftime of the game, Kansas City led 11–9 in first downs at halftime, 181–164 in total yards, and 142–113 in passing yards (Green Bay led 51–39 in rushing yards). Bart Starr completed eight of 13 with no interceptions, while Len Dawson was 11 of 15 with no interceptions. Green Bay led 14–10 at halftime. Green Bay had the ball five times, although only for a minute or so on the last possession; they punted on their first possession, scored a touchdown on their second, punted on their third, scored a touchdown on their fourth, and had the ball when the half ended on their fifth. Kansas City had the ball four times – punting on their first possession, driving to a missed field goal on their second possession, scoring a touchdown on their third, and kicking a field goal on their fourth.

This means, in the second half, Green Bay led 12–6 in first downs, 197–58 in total yards, 115–25 in passing yards, and 82–33 in rushing yards (the Packers won the second half, 21–0). Starr and his late-game replacement, Zeke Bratkowski, were eight for 11 with one interception; Dawson and his late-game replacement, Pete Beathard, were just six for 17, also with one interception. Each team had the ball seven times in the second half, although Green Bay's first possession was just one play and their seventh possession was abbreviated because the game ended. Green Bay scored a touchdown on their first (one play) possession, punted on their second, scored a touchdown on their third, was intercepted at Kansas City's 15-yard line on their fourth (just Starr's fourth interception of the year), scored a touchdown on their fifth, punted on their sixth, and had the ball when the game ended on their seventh possession. Kansas City was intercepted on their first possession – Wood's return to the five set up Pitts' touchdown which made the score 21–10 – and then punted on each of their next six possessions.

Individual statistics

1Completions/attempts
2Carries
3Long gain
4Receptions
5Times targeted

Records established
Because this was the first Super Bowl, a new record was set in every category. All categories are listed in the 2016 NFL Fact book. The following records were set in Super BowlI, according to the official NFL.com boxscore and the Pro-Football-Reference.com game summary. Some records have to meet NFL minimum number of attempts to be recognized. The minimums are shown (in parenthesis).
 

 † This category includes rushing, receiving, interception returns, punt returns, kickoff returns, and fumble returns.
 ‡ Sacks an official statistic since Super Bowl XVII by the NFL. Sacks are listed as "Tackled Attempting to Pass" in the official NFL box score for Super BowlI.

Turnovers are defined as the number of times losing the ball on interceptions and fumbles.

Starting lineups
 
Source:

Officials

 Referee: Norm Schachter (NFL)
 Umpire: George Young (AFL)
 Head Linesman: Bernie Ulman (NFL)
 Line Judge: Al Sabato (AFL)
 Back Judge: Jack Reader (AFL)
 Field Judge: Mike Lisetski (NFL)

 Alternate Referee: Art McNally (NFL)
 Alternate Umpire: Paul Trepinski (AFL)
 Alternate Head Linesman: Burl Toler (NFL)
 Alternate Line Judge: Harry Kessel (AFL)
 Alternate Back Judge: Charley Musser (AFL)
 Alternate Field Judge: Herman Rohrig (NFL)

Note: A six-official system was used by the NFL from  through the  season.

Since officials from the NFL and AFL wore different uniform designs, a "neutral" uniform was designed for this game. These uniforms had the familiar black and white stripes, but the sleeves were all black with the official's uniform number.

See also
 1966 NFL season
 1966 AFL season
 American Football League playoffs

References

External links
 Super Bowl official website
 
 
 
 
 https://www.pro-football-reference.com – Large online database of NFL data and statistics
 Super Bowl play-by-plays from USA Today (Last accessed February 5, 2006)
 All-Time Super Bowl Odds from The Sports Network (Last accessed October 16, 2005)
 Opening of CBS Radio's coverage as recorded from WCCO-AM in Minneapolis

Super Bowl
Green Bay Packers postseason
Kansas City Chiefs postseason
National Football League in Los Angeles
1966 National Football League season
1966 American Football League season
1967 in American football
Simulcasts
1967 in Los Angeles
American football competitions in Los Angeles
January 1967 sports events in the United States
1967 in sports in California